Shake, Rattle & Roll IV is a 1992 Filipino horror anthology film and the fourth installment of the Shake, Rattle & Roll film series. It is produced by Regal Films, and was directed by Peque Gallaga and Lore Reyes. It is an entry to the 1992 Metro Manila Film Festival.

The fifth installment, Shake, Rattle & Roll V, was released in 1994.

Plot

"Ang Guro"
Jodie Abesamis (Manilyn Reynes) is a college student of Mr. Zerrudo's (Edu Manzano) chemistry class who fell in love with him. While in their class, another student named Mabu (Aljon Jimenez), Jodie's boyfriend, makes an invention and accidentally fires it towards their school dean, Ms. Bautista (Nida Blanca). One night, Jodie is still in the computer room finishing her project with Mabu. While working, Mabu gets mad at Jodie after she got insulted by Mr. Zerrudo during class because of daydreaming.

One day, Jodie daydreams about marrying Mr. Zerrudo and then attacks her without getting any help from the guests. Gretch Mati (Sunshine Cruz), Jodie's friend, wakes her up and tells her that they should go to Mr. Zerrudo's lab later in the day to tell their feelings for him. After this, Mabu asks for Jodie's forgiveness while Jodie accepts it and admits that she actually has feelings for Mr. Zerrudo.

At 4:30 pm, Gretch, with Jodie, goes to Mr. Zerrudo's lab and catches him making and drinking a potion. Gretch tries to seduce Mr. Zerrudo but the potion turns him into a monster ala, Dr. Jekyll and Mr. Hyde. Mr. Zerrudo attacks Gretch and kills her. Jodie escapes and tries to tell Dean Bautista about what happened but she doesn't listen to her, thinking that it's just an excuse for her failing grade in Mr. Zerrudo's class. Mr. Zerrudo suddenly appears and tells Jodie to meet him in the lab at night to take a test for her failing grade.

That night, Jodie enters Mr. Zerrudo's lab and makes a potion to stop Mr. Zerrudo from attacking her. Jodie tries to escape but is cornered by Mr. Zerrudo. Mabu and Dean Bautista, who were also still in the school to talk about giving Mabu remedial classes after failing, go to Mr. Zerrudo's lab and find Jodie getting attacked. Mr. Zerrudo catches them and decides to attack and kill Dean Bautista instead, letting Jodie and Mabu escape.

As Jodie and Mabu try to leave, they meet the janitor (Tom Alvarez) and Mr. Zerrudo tosses him to a door, dying on impact. While they escape, Mr. Zerrudo catches up to them and attacks Mabu. When Mr. Zerrudo leaves to find Jodie, Jodie helps Mabu stand up and leave, only to get cornered by a gate, separating them from Mr. Zerrudo. Mr. Zerrudo is able to bend the gate as Jodie and Mabu head back to the lab.

While inside, Mabu tries to make his invention again while Jodie barricades the door. Mr. Zerrudo breaks the door and attacks Jodie, only to be hit by Mabu's invention and is seemingly killed. As Jodie and Mabu begin celebrating, Mr. Zerrudo grasps Jodie's foot, but Mabu successfully kills him permanently.

"Ang Kapitbahay"
A family of an architect father named Rod Mallari (Al Tantay) is about to move to a new apartment house. As he and his wife (Malou de Guzman) argue over their things, their daughter, Nikkie (Aiza Seguerra), snoops over their argument and is caught by her nanny, Gi (Vangie Labalan), and explains what Nikkie's parents are fighting over. Tising (Janice de Belen), another nanny, calls Nikkie so that they can go to the playground to say goodbye to her friends.

While Tising, Nikkie, and Juni, Nikkie's sibling, are at the playground, a dog named Cha-cha, disappears even if it was tied to a tree with a leash. Soon, Nikkie catches a monster (Rene Hinojales) taking Juni out of her crib and kidnaps her to its tree. When Nikkie tells Tising about what happened, Tising doesn't believe her and calls the barrio's captain, Capt. Salvi (Phillip Gamboa), and lieutenant, Lt. Damaso (Romy Romulo), instead. The parents, who treat Juni as their own child, attack Tising who is held responsible for the disappearance.

When Nikkie sees Tising getting mobbed, she tries to explain about seeing the monster kidnapping Juni, but no one believes her and still attacks Tising. Tising is instructed to go to prison to be interrogated. When everyone goes home, Nikkie goes back to the monster's tree to confront it but the monster throws a bone at her instead, causing her to leave.

At night, Nikkie tells Yaya Gi about what happened. Yaya Gi believes her and tells her that the monster is called a Witawit. The Witawit are creatures who live in trees they like and capture children when they are upset at people who cut trees they live in. It just happens that children are the ones that play near trees and that's why they are the ones that get captured.

While Nikkie is asleep, the Witawit enters the house and makes different noises, causing Nikkie to wake up. Nikkie encounters the Witawit while she tries to find Yaya Gi and screams. When she goes upstairs, Tising, getting desperate, appears with a knife and tells Nikkie that they should go to the mango tree to find Juni.

While at the apartment, Nikkie's father feels that something has happened and that they should go back to the house. In the playground, Tising orders Nikkie to climb the tree to find Juni and never go down unless she finds her. Nikkie, in the tree, finds her friends Shiela (Rea Xeniana), Bambi (Lady Lee), and Andrew (Ram Mojica) trapped in cages with Juni. Her friends tell her that they are hostages because of the Witawit getting worried about his tree getting cut. They also tell her that it was Cha-cha the dog's bone that the Witawit threw at her and that the Witawit can communicate with them through their minds without talking at all.

Bambi asks Nikkie to help them escape but the Witawit appears before they can leave the tree. While this was happening, Nikkie's parents arrive back home and the captain and lieutenant find Tising waiting at the mango tree. Tising, having no more patience left, decides to cut the Witawit'''s tree, hurting the Witawit as well. The Witawit, hurt, asks Nikkie's help to stop Tising from cutting the tree. Tising does stop and Nikkie tells the Witawit that Tising and the others don't know anything about its problem and that it should return Nikkie and her friends back so that they can tell the problems on its behalf.

The Witawit and Nikkie reconcile and it brings back the children, with Tising, the captain, lieutenant, Yaya Gi, and Nikkie's parents seeing it all happen. After a few days, the Witawit's tree stays at the playground and Nikkie's family has to move to their new apartment. Nikkie, worried that the tree might be cut when they leave, is told by Yaya Gi to promise not to let any tree get cut as long as she goes anywhere. Nikkie promises and the episode closes with a shot of the kids painting the tree's trunk.

"Ang Madre"
Colorful ladies who live in the slum talk about a Manananggal who is attacking near their place. Near the place of the colorful ladies, there lives a family consisting of Astrude (Ai-Ai delas Alas), Puri (Gina Alajar), and Teks (IC Mendoza), Puri's son. They also have neighbors, Adobe (Rey Solo) and his sons, who tell them about the Manananggal and warn them to be careful around her.

During the night, Adobe and his sons are attacked and killed by the Manananggal as Puri and her family watch from inside their house. After this, their house is attacked but they aren't killed in the process.

The next day at the barrio's hospital, Astrude asks a doctor named Apol (Miguel Rodriguez) if she can sell her blood. Dr. Apol tells Astrude that they don't and rejects her offer, so she decides to leave and find a job near them. Puri and Teks are also there for Teks' check-ups.

Puri asks why Dr. Apol picked their barrio to give medical help since there's a Manananggal in the area, but Dr. Apol doesn't believe in these things. A nun named Mary John (Aiko Melendez) overhears their conversation and tells everyone near her that they shouldn't fear the creature because it isn't real and that they should only fear other people.

The people disagree and talk a lot until Aling Iya (Lilia Cuntapay) arrives and they suddenly stop talking. Aling Iya gives Dr. Apol a bag and she leaves. Monang (Bella Flores), the owner of the ladies club who is also there, asks why the doctor is interacting with Aling Iya, since everyone thinks Aling Iya is the actual Manananggal.

At night, Astrude arrives back home and tells Puri that she got a job as a rapper. After this, they enter their house. Teks, looking outside, finds someone lurking around. Puri and Astrude decide to hunt the person, but they find the Manananggal stuck on an antenna instead, revealing that it was Sister Mary John all along. Teks, still following the figure, finds the Manananggal's lower half. Sis. Mary John suddenly is able to escape, allowing Puri and Astrude to realize that there's a bag full of clothes near them and that Teks is missing. Teks finds his way back home and is greeted with a crying Puri.

In the daytime, Teks finds a rundown bodega and hears sounds of arguing. Suddenly, Sis. Mary John appears and presumably ate someone. At the hospital, Monang and a group of people go to Aling Iya's home to kill her. When Aling Iya is almost killed, Dr. Apol rescues her and reveals that she just roams around the streets at night to give the poor their necessities and that she isn't the Mananananggal. During this, Sis. Mary John stands near Puri and Teks. Teks decides to attack her but is stopped by Puri before doing it further.

In the nighttime, Teks roams around the nightclub Astrude works in to look for ingredients to kill Sis. Mary John. He decides to take bottles of hot sauce but is caught by Astrude. Outside, Teks tells her about his suspicions on Sis. Mary John, so Astrude believes him. They head to the bodega to attack her, but they catch her turning into a Manananggal instead.

They try to escape, but Astrude knocks down a piece of metal, making a sound, and gets chased by Sis. Mary John. Teks escapes, but Astrude is attacked. Puri, realizing Teks and Astrude are gone, is also in the bodega, but is chased by Sis. Mary John as well. Sis. Mary John leaves and chases Teks, who was putting hot sauce on her lower half and disintegrates it. Teks manages to get inside a large construction tube, letting Puri stab Sis. Mary John in the back after trying to get him.

Sis. Mary John is able to escape and attack Puri but is squirted with hot sauce by Teks, killing and exploding her. Puri is able to find Astrude and the three of them reunite, but they hear another flight of wings. It turns out that Dr. Apol was a Manananggal as well and that he and Mary John were just pretending to help the townsfolk. Puri decides to distract Dr. Apol while Teks puts hot sauce on his lower half. Dr. Apol tries to attack Puri but is struck with hot sauce and is cornered, letting the sun disintegrate his upper half. Sunrise comes and Puri and Teks celebrate their success.

Cast

Ang Guro
Manilyn Reynes as Jodie Abesamis
Edu Manzano as Arturo "Bodjie" Zerrudo
Aljon Jimenez as Mabu
Sunshine Cruz as Gretch Mati
Nida Blanca as Dean Leticia Bautista
Koko Trinidad as Priest
Mae-Anne Adonis as Ms. Pecatoste
Dido de la Paz as Mr. Abesamis
Tom Alvarez as the Janitor

Ang Kapitbahay
Janice de Belen as Tising
Aiza Seguerra as Nikkie Mallari
Al Tantay as Architect Rod Mallari
Malou de Guzman as Mrs. Mallari
Vangie Labalan as Yaya Gi
Phillip Gamboa as Capt. Salvi
Romy Romulo as Lt. Damaso
Lady Lee as Bambi
Ram Mojica as Andrew
Rea Xeniana as Sheila
Gigette Reyes as Mrs. Manahan
Mely Tagasa as Mrs. Baltazar
Idda Yaneza as Andrew's Mother
Minnie Aguilar as Sheila's Mother
Rene Hinojales as Witawit

Ang Madre
Gina Alajar as Puri
Miguel Rodriguez as Dr. Apol
Aiko Melendez as Sister Mary John
Ai-Ai delas Alas as Astrude
IC Mendoza as Teks
Bella Flores as Mama Monang
Lilia Cuntapay as Aling Iya
Jinky Laurel as Madonna
Fame de los Santos as Sheena
Mel Kimura as Whitney
Rey Solo as Adobe
Edison Magno as Bogs
Pen Medina as N.G.O. Member
Jasmine Vargas as Member of Church

Home videoShake, Rattle & Roll IV'' was released on VHS by Regal Home Video in 1993.

Accolades

See also
Shake, Rattle & Roll (film series)
List of ghost films

References

External links

1992 horror films
1992 films
Philippine comedy horror films
1990s Tagalog-language films
1990s comedy horror films
Regal Entertainment films
1992 comedy films
Films directed by Peque Gallaga
Films directed by Lore Reyes